Tugg may refer to:

 Tugg the Bull Terrier, American Kennel Club Award of Canine Excellence winner and star of his own Web Series.
 Captain Tugg, television host
 Tugg Speedman, character from Tropic Thunder
 Tugg Inc., a defunct film-related crowdsourcing website

See also

 Tug (disambiguation)